The 2014–15 FC Kuban Krasnodar season was the fourth successive season that the club played in the Russian Premier League, the highest tier of football in Russia. They will participate in the Russian Cup as well as the Russian Premier League.

Squad
Updated 28 July 2014, according to the club's official website.Out on loan

Transfers

Summer

In:

Out:

Winter

In:

Out:

 Nacional

Friendlies

Competitions

Russian Premier League

Results by round

Matches

League table

Russian Cup

Final

Squad statistics

Appearances and goals

|-
|colspan="14"|Players away from Kuban Krasnodar on loan:|-
|colspan="14"|Players who left Kuban Krasnodar during the season:''

|}

Goal scorers

Disciplinary record

Notes
 MSK time changed from UTC+4 to UTC+3 permanently on 26 October 2014.

References

FC Kuban Krasnodar seasons
Kuban Krasnodar